Chikara (stylized in all capital letters and sometimes referred to as Chikara Pro) was an American professional wrestling promotion based in Philadelphia, Pennsylvania. It was founded in 2002 by professional wrestlers Mike Quackenbush and Reckless Youth, who also served as trainers and in-ring performers.

The promotion held multiple live events per month, with the majority taking place at the Wrestle Factory. Two of their major events, September's King of Trios, the promotion's premiere event, and April's Tag World Grand Prix were centered on tag team and trios matches. Their other major events included Aniversario, held in May, and the Young Lions Cup tournament, held between June and August. In 2011, Chikara introduced the Grand Championship, the promotion's primary singles championship.

The promotion closed in June 2020, after several allegations of abuse, misconduct, and sexual assault/harassment were made against it, as part of the Speaking Out movement.

History

In the summer of 2000, after "Reckless Youth" Tom Carter had been released from his World Wrestling Federation developmental deal, he, Mike Quackenbush and Don Montoya started talking about starting a wrestling school, which would teach professional wrestling in various international styles. Originally, the school was to be called "Impact Wrestling" (not to be confused with the later promotion of the same name), but when Montoya decided not to put up money for its foundation and left the project, Carter and Quackenbush decided they needed a new name. The Wrestle Factory was founded by Carter and Quackenbush in Allentown, Pennsylvania on January 7, 2002. The first class included UltraMantis, Mister Zero, Dragonfly, Hallowicked, and Ichabod Slayne. In May of the same year, Chikara expanded into a wrestling promotion with the intent of showcasing its students. The first show on May 25, 2002, featured not only the Wrestle Factory students and head trainers, but several other independent wrestlers, including Don Montoya, CM Punk, Colt Cabana, Chris Hero, Love Bug, Marshal Law, and Blind Rage. The main event of the first show featured Quackenbush and Youth joined by Don Montoya as the Black T-shirt Squad defeat the Gold Bond Mafia of Chris Hero, CM Punk, and Colt Cabana. In the early days, Blind Rage, Hallowicked, and Ichabod Slayne formed a stable known as the Night Shift, which became the top group of rudos (or heels) in the promotion. They frequently feuded with tecnicos (faces) Quackenbush, Youth, and UltraMantis. Notable events of 2002 included an appearance by former World Championship Wrestling star La Parka, who joined Mister Zero against Quackenbush and Youth, and the opening of the short-lived sister promotion Kiryoku Pro, which highlighted female wrestling.

2002 was also marked by a lawsuit against Chikara for promoting shows at the Wrestle Factory. Neighborhood activists claimed that the building was not properly zoned for assembly, and that the shows detracted from the "complexion of the community". It was eventually ruled that Chikara provided inadequate parking for their shows, and would not be allowed to promote out of the Wrestle Factory any longer. This deterred Chikara from holding any more shows until October. During the Chikara hiatus, they released tapes of their early shows, titled "The Renaissance Dawns" and "Baila, Parka, Baila", and the wrestlers worked showcase matches in other promotions, such as IWA Mid-South. Chikara soon reached an agreement with St. John’s Lutheran Church in Allentown to hold shows there, only eight blocks from the Wrestle Factory. Chikara also began a second Wrestle Factory class, but lost trainer Reckless Youth at the beginning of the class, as he left the wrestling business. The first show in St. John's saw the Wildcards (Eddie Kingston and BlackJack Marciano), Gran Akuma, D. J. Skittlez, Melvin Snodgrass and Lester Crabtree debut, and shortly after, they were joined by Wrestle Factory graduates Jigsaw and Bryce Remsburg. Soon after Chikara debuted the Young Lions Cup tournament, a concept still used by the promotion. Commonly abbreviated as the YLC, the tournament was designed to showcase the best of the Wrestle Factory graduates. Hallowicked defeated Mister Zero to win the inaugural tournament, becoming the first-ever Young Lions Cup Champion in the process. In December 2002, Chikara took a two-week break during Christmastime before returning in 2003, establishing a tradition of "seasons" that they maintain today.

In 2004, Chris Hero became a co-trainer at the Chikara Wrestle Factory, replacing Carter. In 2005, Jorge "Skayde" Rivera joined as the third trainer. In March 2005, the school moved from Allentown to the New Alhambra Arena, in Philadelphia. They then took over the training for Combat Zone Wrestling, leading to the school's new name of CZW/Chikara Wrestle Factory. After the schools split in 2007, the training center became once again simply known as the Chikara Wrestle Factory. In 2007, Claudio Castagnoli took over Chris Hero's training duties.

On March 2, 2008, Chikara drew their biggest crowd ever of over 550 people during the King of Trios finals. That record was broken on January 31, 2010, when their first show of season nine, A Touch of Class, drew over 600 fans. Later that year, on July 25, the record was broken once again at Chikarasaurus Rex: King of Show, which drew 755 fans. The show was released by Smart Mark Video on DVD less than 24 hours after its conclusion.

On April 26, 2009, Chikara announced a working agreement with Dragon Gate USA, which saw Chikara wrestlers take part in Dragon Gate USA events. Throughout the years, Chikara has also worked with several Japanese promotions in bringing their talent over to the United States, including Dragon Gate, Ice Ribbon, JWP Joshi Puroresu, and Sendai Girls' Pro Wrestling.  In 2010, Chikara established a close working relationship with the Osaka Pro Wrestling promotion. In December 2011, Chikara partnered with numerous Japanese promotion to hold the three-day-long JoshiMania event, which featured some of the biggest names in joshi puroresu. Wrestlers such as Aja Kong, Dick Togo, The Great Sasuke, Jinsei Shinzaki, Kana, Kaori Yoneyama, Kota Ibushi, Manami Toyota, and Mayumi Ozaki have made rare American appearances for Chikara.

On April 25, 2010, Chikara announced the release of a video game, titled Rudo Resurrection, for multiple gaming platforms later in the year. After not being heard of again for four years, it was announced on May 2, 2014, that a new developer, Rotary Games, had picked up the rights to the game.

On August 1, 2011, Chikara announced that their first ever live Internet pay-per-view (iPPV), titled High Noon, would take place November 13, 2011, and would feature the crowning of the first ever Chikara Grand Champion. The event would again break Chikara's attendance record, drawing 864 fans. During 2012, High Noon was followed by the Chikarasaurus Rex: How to Hatch a Dinosaur and Under the Hood Internet pay-per-views.

In February 2012, Chikara launched their first ever web comic, written by Joey Esposito and drawn by Alex Cormack, telling the secret origin of Frightmare. On April 6, 2013, Chikara took part in WrestleCon, held during the WrestleMania 29 weekend in Secaucus, New Jersey, holding an event, which again broke the promotion's attendance record.

On June 2, 2013, Chikara ran an angle at the conclusion of their fourth iPPV, Aniversario: Never Compromise, where the event was shut down by Director of Fun Wink Vavasseur. Following the event, Chikara went inactive, "canceling" all upcoming events, though in reality these events were never scheduled to take place. Chikara held no official events for the rest of 2013, though wrestlers from the promotion did hold a small event on November 2 in Philadelphia's FDR Skatepark with the storyline that they were trying to revive the promotion. In October 2013, Neon Alley acquired rights to 26 Chikara events, which would start airing on the channel on Sundays as part of the new fall lineup. On February 1, 2014, it was announced that Chikara would be returning on May 25. On February 10, 2014, it was announced that The Wrestle Factory would start a new training class at the 2300 Arena on March 1.

In April 2015, Chikara made its debut in the United Kingdom with a four-show tour held across England and Wales and launched Chikaratopia, a streaming service featuring past events. That same year on July 29, the promotion launched a new weekly program, entitled Journey Into Chikara, which would air live on both Chikaratopia and YouTube. In December 2016, Chikara concluded its 16th season. However, when the promotion returned in February 2017, it was announced as the start of season 18. Season 17 had been taped during the break and would be streamed on Chikaratopia.

On August 7, 2019, Chikara announced a working relationship with Michinoku Pro Wrestling.

On June 24, 2020, Quackenbush announced Chikara was shutting down amid allegations of misconduct within the company.

Chikara Wrestle Factory
On January 7, 2002, "Reckless Youth" Tom Carter and Mike Quackenbush founded the Chikara Wrestle Factory, a wrestling school based in Allentown, Pennsylvania. Following the start of the Wrestle Factory's second class, Carter departed from Chikara and ultimately left the wrestling industry. In 2004, Chris Hero became a co-trainer at the Wrestle Factory, filling the vacancy left by Carter's departure. In 2005, Mexican luchador Jorge "Skayde" Rivera became the school's third trainer. In March 2005, the school moved from Allentown to the New Alhambra Arena, in Philadelphia. In 2007, Chris Hero left Chikara and the Wrestle Factory, with Claudio Castagnoli taking over Hero's training duties. In August 2011, Castagnoli signed with WWE, and departed the Wrestle Factory. Former guest instructors included El Pantera, Terry Funk, CM Punk, Marty Jannetty, and many others.

At the time of June 2020, head trainer Mike Quackenbush was assisted by trainers Fire Ant, Hallowicked, and Ophidian. As of now, training to prospective professional wrestlers, managers, valets, and referees in Northeastern Philadelphia, Pennsylvania is offered in all styles of pro wrestling, including lucha libre, puroresu, Lancashire, and catch, among others.

Championships

Other accomplishments

Notable alumni

 1-2-3 Kid / Sean Waltman / X-Pac
 2 Cold Scorpio
 A. C. H.
 Acid Jaz
 Aero Star
 El Alebrije
 Cedric Alexander
 Bryan Alvarez
 Amasis
 Amazing Kong
 Amazing Red
 Josh Abercrombie / Josh Raymond
 Mark Andrews
 Mark Angelosetti
 Ares
 Austin Aries
 Atlantis
 Ax
 B-Boy
 The Barbarian
 Tyler Bate
 Mike Bennett
 Big Stevie Cool
 Sinn Bodhi
 Chris Bosh
 Max Boyer / Maxime Boyer
 Brad Bradley
 Brain Damage
 Harlem Bravado
 Lancelot Bravado
 Jay Briscoe
 Mark Briscoe
 D'Lo Brown
 Bull Pain
 BxB Hulk
 C. Red
 Colt Cabana / Matt Classic
 Call-Me-Kevin
 Sami Callihan
 Arik Cannon
 Carpenter Ant
 Claudio Castagnoli / Cesaro
 Chimaera
 Dash Chisako
 Chiva IV / Chiva Kid
 Tommaso Ciampa
 Cima
 Adam Cole
 Danny Boy Collins
 Command Bolshoi
 Jervis Cottonbelly
 Matt Cross
 Da Blue Guy
 Allison Danger
 Christopher Daniels / Curry Man
 Danny Daniels
 Bryan Danielson
 KC Day / Cloudy
 Sara Del Rey
 Colin Delaney / Colin Olsen
 Delirious
 Chris Dickinson
 J. J. Dillon
 DJ Hyde / Mano Metalico
 Naruki Doi
 Tim Donst
 Lince Dorado
 Drago
 Ryan Drago / Simon Grimm
 Tommy Dreamer
 Pete Dunne
 Dustin / Chuck Taylor
 Sonjay Dutt
 Dymond
 Madison Eagles
 Robbie Eagles
 Ebessan (I) / Kikutaro
 Eddie Edwards
 Egotistico Fantastico
 Robbie Ellis
 Tommy End
 Escorpion Egipcio
 Excalibur
 Fénix
 Orange Cassidy / Fire Ant
 Jody Fleisch
 A. R. Fox
 Terry Frazier
 Frightmare
 Tsukasa Fujimoto
 Gangrel
 Johnny Gargano
 El Generico
 Vin Gerard / Equinox
 Glacier
 Gran Akuma
 The Great Sanada
 The Great Sasuke
 Green Ant (I) / Silver Ant
 Green Ant (II)
 Jonathan Gresham / Hieracon
 Chavo Guerrero Jr.
 Drew Gulak / Soldier Ant
 Billy Gunn
 Dasher Hatfield
 Hailey Hatred
 Hallowicked
 Ayako Hamada
 Daisuke Harada
 Daizee Haze
 Helios / Ricochet
 Cheech Hernandez / Cheech
 Hernandez
 Chris Hero
 Hollywood Nova / Simon Dean
 Homicide
 Hydra
 Princess Kimber Lee
 Kota Ibushi
 Icarus
 Incognito
 Greg Iron
 Ryuji Ito
 Matt Jackson
 Nick Jackson
 Jimmy Jacobs
 Jagged / Scott Parker
 Mickie James
 Marty Jannetty
 Jazz
 Jigsaw
 Johnny
 Joker / Colt Cabunny
 Kagetora
 Kana
 Maria Kanellis
 Manami Katsu
 Kenny
 Johnny Kidd
 Eddie Kingston
 Mickie Knuckles
 Kodama
 Aja Kong
 Atsushi Kotoge
 Kudo
 Tsubasa Kuragaki
 Yujiro Kushida
 La Parka
 La Parkita
 Brodie Lee
 Trevor Lee
 Candice LeRae
 Jay Lethal
 Jushin Thunder Liger
 Scott Lost
 Heidi Lovelace
 Jerry Lynn
 Mad Man Pondo
 Magno
 Makoto
 Mercedes Martinez
 Mascarita Dorada
 James Mason
 Shane Matthews
 Joel Maximo
 Jose Maximo
 Wil Maximo
 m.c. KZ
 Jessie McKay
 Meng
 Mikey
 Milanito Collection a.t.
 Milano Collection A.T.
 Miyawaki
 Masaaki Mochizuki
 Aldo Montoya
 Jon Moxley
 Necro Butcher / CP Munk
 Osamu Nishimura
 Shinjitsu Nohashi
 Amber O'Neal
 Kyle O'Reilly
 Yuji Okabayashi
 Kazuchika Okada
 Jimmy Olsen / Equinox (II)
 One Man Gang
 Ophidian
 El Oriental
 Chase Owens
 Mayumi Ozaki
 Pac
 El Pantera
 Archibald Peck / Mixed Martial Archie / The Mysterious and Handsome Stranger / The Latvian Proud Oak
 Portia Perez
 Pierrothito
 Player Dos / Stupefied
 Player Uno
 Psycho
 CM Punk
 Mike Quackenbush
 Rain
 Reckless Youth
 Joel Redman
 Ashley Remington
 Rey Bucanero
 Willie Richardson
 Matt Riddle
 Jorge Rivera
 Marshe Rockett
 Rockstar Spud
 Romeo Roselli
 Ian Rotten
 Ruckus
 Joey Ryan
 Sabian
 Chris Sabin
 Zack Sabre Jr.
 Sendai Sachiko
 Raisha Saeed
 Johnny Saint
 Sumie Sakai
 Sha Samuels
 Tito Santana
 Sassy Stephie
 Meiko Satomura
 Daisuke Sekimoto
 Trent Seven
 SeXXXy Eddy
 Shark Girl
 Alex Shelley
 Mototsugu Shimizu
 Mima Shimoda
 Shingo
 Jinsei Shinzaki
 Mio Shirai
 Emil Sitoci
 Smash
 Al Snow
 Kevin Steen
 Martin Stone
 Jonny Storm
 Shane Storm / Stigma
 A.J. Styles
 Super Dragon
 Super Shisa
 Rich Swann
 Larry Sweeney
 Matt Sydal
 Tadasuke
 Tatanka
 Dave Taylor
 Thief Ant
 Antonio Thomas
 Tigre Uno
 Rhett Titus
 Dick Togo
 Tank Toland
 Manami Toyota
 Akira Tozawa
 Trauma
 Toshie Uematsu
 Ultramantis / UltraMantis Black
 Victoria
 The Warlord
 Worker Ant (I)
 Worker Ant (II)
 Shiima Xion
 Yamamoto
 Keita Yano
 Kaori Yoneyama
 Masato Yoshino
 Drake Younger

Commercial DVD releases
Big Vision Entertainment releases

See also
 List of independent wrestling promotions in the United States

References

External links

 
 Official message board
 Chikara Podcast-A-Go-Go
 Filsinger Games: Chikara

 
American companies established in 2002
American companies disestablished in 2020
American independent professional wrestling promotions based in Pennsylvania
2002 establishments in Pennsylvania
2020 disestablishments in Pennsylvania
Entertainment companies established in 2002
Entertainment companies disestablished in 2020
Professional wrestling in Philadelphia
Companies based in Philadelphia